Miss Bangalore (Kannada: ಮಿಸ್ ಬೆಂಗಳೂರು) is a 1967 Indian Kannada film, directed by P. S. Murthy. The film stars Arun Kumar, B. Vijayalakshmi, Jayanthi and Narasimharaju in the lead roles. The film has musical score by P. L. Sriramulu.

Cast
Arun Kumar
B. Vijayalakshmi
Jayanthi
Narasimharaju

References

1960s Kannada-language films